Gemixystus transkeiensis is a species of sea snail, a marine gastropod mollusk in the family Muricidae, the murex snails or rock snails.

Description

Distribution
This marine spêcies occurs off Transkei, South Africa.

References

 Houart, R. (1987) Revision of the subfamily Trophoninae (Mollusca: Gastropoda: Muricidae) in Southern Africa, with description of four new species. Apex 2(2): 25-58
 Houart, R. & Héros, V. (2019). The genus Gemixystus Iredale, 1929 (Gastropoda: Muricidae: Trophoninae) in New Caledonia with the description of two new species and some notes on the genus in the Indo-West Pacific. Novapex. 20 (1-2): 1-12.

Ocenebrinae
Gastropods described in 1987